Pymore is a small village one mile north of Bridport, Dorset.  Served by a pub, The Pymore Inn, Pymore has recently undergone a redevelopment - the site of the old rope factory, around the River Brit, now contains a small development of new houses and flats. Pymore has a long history of making rope, which used to employ many of the people living in the village, though today many residents work in Bridport. Pymore is surrounded by agricultural land, with a small copse and reed bed nearby, providing habitats for wildlife.

External links

Villages in Dorset